Christos may refer to: 

 Jesus of Nazareth
 Christ (title), a title for the Jewish Messiah in Christianity
 Christos (surname)
 Christos (given name)
, a Greek owned, Liberian flagged cargo ship in service 1962-71

See also 
 Christ (disambiguation)
 Christo (disambiguation)
 Christa (disambiguation)
 Christus (disambiguation)